The Dorchester Branch may refer to either of the following Massachusetts rail lines:
The Fairmount Line of the MBTA Commuter Rail system
The Ashmont branch of the MBTA rapid transit Red Line